Nakai-Nam Theun National Park in Nakai District, Khammouane Province, Laos, is one of the last remaining wildernesses in Southeast Asia. Nakai-Nam Theun covers approximately 4,270 km2 of the Annamite Range and the adjacent Nakai Plateau in Khammouane and Bolikhamsai Provinces. It was designated a national park on 15 February 2019 by Prime Ministerial Decree No. 36, 15 February 2019. It is managed by the Ministry of Agriculture and Forestry (MAF). It is adjacent to the Vu Quang National Park of Vietnam.

Rivers
From north to south, riversheds in the park consist the following rivers:
Nam Kata (eastern part only; the Nam Houay, on which the town of Na Kadok is located, is a tributary)
Nam Xot
Nam Mon
Nam Theun
Nam Noy
Nam Pheo (a tributary of the Nam Noy)
Nam One

All are tributaries of the Nam Theun to the southwest in the Nakai Plateau.

Habitat
A series of surveys conducted since 1994 by the co-operative programme of the Wildlife Conservation Society (WCS), the Lao Department of Forestry, and the International Union for Conservation of Nature (IUCN) have revealed that the area has a high biodiversity value. Semi-evergreen forest, deciduous dipterocarp forest and stands of pine are all found on the Nakai Plateau and in the Annamite foothills to the east, grading into more exclusively evergreen forests as the land rises towards the Vietnamese border. Higher still, huge areas of montane fagaceous forest cloak the slopes, interspersed with patches of Fokienia hodginsii, a commercially valuable cypress-like conifer. Above c. 2,000 m the fagaceous forest gives way to more stunted, rhododendron-dominated ericaceous cloudforest.

Flora
Species of plants listed as threatened by IUCN include conifer Cephalotaxus mannii. The only known population of Vietnamese White Pine in Laos is in Nakai-Nam Theun.

Fauna

Mammals
Species of mammals, some discovered relatively recently, include the following:
Saola
Giant muntjac
Roosevelt's muntjac
Truong Son muntjac
Indo-chinese warty pig
Heude's pig
Annamite striped rabbit
Javan rhinoceros (Rhinoceros sondaicus annamiticus)
Indochinese tiger
Asian elephant

Birds
More than 400 bird species have been identified in Nakai-Nam Theun and the adjacent northern extension. This is by far the highest avian species richness of any site yet surveyed in Laos and is the highest recorded in a single protected area in Southeast Asia.

Languages
Many endangered Vietic languages are spoken in the Nakai-Nam Theun area. The Vietic peoples are the indigenous peoples of the Nakai-Nam Theun area, and have deep knowledge of the local ecology. The Saek language, which preserves many archaic phonological features not found in any other Tai language, is also spoken in the area, often alongside Vietic languages in the same villages. Saek speakers had lived in the area for about 300 years, and had originally come from Vietnam. Bru speakers had moved to the area in the 1800s and 1900s, and now make up the majority of the population. Lao and Vietnamese speakers, most of whom are recent migrants, are also found in the vicinity.

See also
Protected areas of Laos
Nakai District
Nam Theun
Nam Theun 2 Dam

References

Geography of Khammouane province
Geography of Bolikhamsai province